Muscleblind-like protein 3 is a protein that in humans is encoded by the MBNL3 gene.

References

Further reading